Lucía Soto Muñoz (1919–1970), known professionally as Luchy Soto, was a Spanish film and television actress. She was the daughter of the actors Guadalupe Muñoz Sampedro and Manuel Soto. She married actor Luis Peña in 1946.

Cast
 World Crisis (1934)
 The Dancer and the Worker (1936)
 The Unloved Woman (1940)
 The Strange Marchioness (1940)
 Journey to Nowhere (1942)
 Television Stories (1965)

References

Bibliography 
 D'Lugo, Marvin. Guide to the Cinema of Spain. Greenwood Publishing, 1997.

External links 
 

1919 births
1970 deaths
Spanish television actresses
Spanish film actresses
People from Madrid